Plumbland is a civil parish in the Borough of Allerdale in Cumbria, England.  It contains eleven listed buildings that are recorded in the National Heritage List for England.  Of these, one is listed at Grade II*, the middle of the three grades, and the others are at Grade II, the lowest grade.  The parish contains the village of Plumbland and the settlements of Threapland, Parsonby and Arkleby, and is otherwise rural.  The listed buildings include houses and associated structures, a church, a dovecote, a bridge, a farmhouse, and a school later used as a village hall.


Key

Buildings

References

Citations

Sources

Lists of listed buildings in Cumbria
Listed buildings